

Table

References
Footnotes

Citations

 0001
Discovered using the Kepler spacecraft, 0001
 0001